

Bhalswa landfill is an overfilled waste dumping site located in Delhi, India; it is over  high. The site is a major source environmental pollution, fire hazards, and public health and safety issues.

See also

 Mavallipura
 Waste management in India
 Air pollution in India
 Water pollution in India
 Water supply and sanitation in India
 Environmental issues in India

References

Notes

Citations

Further reading
Journals
 Chhibber, B. (2015). Challenges And Policy Responses To Hazardous Waste Management. World Affairs: The Journal of International Issues, 19(2), 86–99. 
 Schindler, S., Demaria, F., & Pandit, S. B. (2012). Delhi’s Waste Conflict. Economic and Political Weekly, 47(42), 18–21. 
News
 
 
 
 
 
 
 
 
 
 
Video

External links
 S. Goswami and S. Basak. (May 27, 2021). Living Near Urban Landfills in India.

Environmental issues in India
Waste management in India
Landfills in India